1999–2000 was the first season that Division 1 functioned as the third-level of ice hockey in Sweden, below the second-level Allsvenskan and the top-level Elitserien (now the SHL).

Format 
The league was divided into four regional groups. In each region, the top teams qualified for a promotion round for the opportunity to be promoted to the Allsvenskan. The bottom teams in each group were forced to play in a relegation round in order to retain their spot in Division 1 for the following season. These were also conducted within each region.

Season

Northern region

First round

Group A

Group B

Promotion round

Relegation round

Group A

Group B

Western region

First round

Group A

Group B

Promotion round

Relegation round

Eastern region

First round

Group A

Group B

Second round

Main group

Qualification round

Group A

Group B

Final games 
 Tierp IF - Väsby IK 2:2/4:2
 Järfälla HC - Skå IK 3:3/3:4

Promotion round

Relegation round

Group A

Group B

Relegation game 
 IK Tälje - Sudret HC 6:2/4:2

Southern region

First round

Group A

Group B

Second round

Main group

Qualification round

Group A

Group B

Final round

Group A

Group B

Promotion round

Relegation round

Group A

Group B

Group C

External links 
 Season on hockeyarchives.info

3
Swedish Division I seasons